Tarrafal de São Nicolau is a city in the western part of the island of São Nicolau, Cape Verde. With a population of 3,733 (2010 census), it is the most populous settlement of the island. It is the seat of the Tarrafal de São Nicolau Municipality, and the main port of the island. It is situated on the west coast, 9 km southwest of Ribeira Brava.

Subdivisions
The city is divided into neighborhoods (bairros) including:
Alto Fontaínhas
Alto Saco
Amarelo Pintado
Campedrada
Chã de Poça
João Baptista
Telha

History
Before the 19th century, the roadstead of Tarrafal was little used because it was far from the main settlement of the island, Ribeira Brava. It was mentioned as Terrafal in the 1747 map by Jacques-Nicolas Bellin. It became an anchorage for whaling ships in the 19th century, and fish processing infrastructure was built, leading to further growth of the settlement. The settlement became a town in the early 1990s and a city in 2010.

Transport

The port of Tarrafal was constructed in 1991. It has 2 quays and a roll-on/roll-off ramp and a passenger terminal. The total length of the quays is 137 m, and the maximum depth is 7 m. There are ferry connections from Tarrafal to the islands of São Vicente (Mindelo) and Santiago (Praia).

See also
List of villages and settlements in Cape Verde

References

Cities in Cape Verde
Tarrafal de São Nicolau
Municipal seats in Cape Verde
Populated coastal places in Cape Verde
Geography of São Nicolau, Cape Verde
Ports and harbours of Cape Verde